Rita Daniela de Guzman Iringan (born September 15, 1995), popularly known as Rita Daniela, is a Filipino actress, singer and television host. Grand Champion of the very first season of Popstar Kids. She and Ken Chan became a popular loveteam after starring in top-rated teleseries My Special Tatay. 

Daniela was one of the Journey Hosts in The Clash from second season until its fourth season.

She is currently one of the main hosts in the musical-comedy variety show, All-Out Sundays.

Life and career
A granddaughter of the late Filipino actor Teroy de Guzman, Rita's career was launched after being the first grand champion of QTV's PopStar Kids. Since winning the contest, she has made numerous appearances on different shows on both GMA and QTV now GTV. In addition, she was one of the members of the singing group Sugarpop a children's group composed of the five finalists of the first season of PopStar Kids, which appeared regularly on GMA's concert television show SOP Rules.

She appeared as an antagonist in several Teleserye of GMA Network where she changed her screen name to Rita de Guzman, the surname of her maternal grandfather, the late comedian Teroy de Guzman

When she decided to focus again in her singing career, GMA Artist Center decided to change her screen name to Rita Daniela.

Discography

Studio albums
Rita Daniela (Self-titled album)
Bobrey (Live)

Extended play albums
Forever With You EP

Other albums
SugarPop
SugarPop Repackaged

Filmography

Television series

Television shows

Hosting

Films

Soundtracks

Awards and nominations

Musical play

References

External links
  (archived)
 
 Sparkle GMA Artist Center profile

1995 births
Living people
Filipino child actresses
Filipino child singers
Filipino film actresses
de Guzman
Reality show winners
Filipino television actresses
Filipino television personalities
Filipino television presenters
Filipino television variety show hosts
People from Quezon City
Actresses from Metro Manila
GMA Network personalities
GMA Music artists
21st-century Filipino singers